NA-47 Islamabad-II is a constituency for the National Assembly of Pakistan.

Area
The constituency mostly consists of urban areas of Islamabad in addition to Bhara Kahu.
During the 2018 delimitation, this constituency took areas from two former constituencies namely NA-48 (Islamabad-I) and NA-49 (Islamabad-II), the areas with their respective former constituencies are shown below:

Areas acquired from NA-48 Islamabad-I
Sectors E-7, F-7, G-7, G-8, G-9, H-8, H-9, I-8,E-10,E-11 and I-9

Areas acquired from NA-49 Islamabad-II
Sectors F-6, and G-6
Constitution Ave
Bari Imam
Mohra Nur
Phulgran
Suhan Dehati
Chattar
Shehzad Town
Lakhwal

Members of Parliament

2018-2023: NA-53 Islamabad-II

Election 2018 

General elections were held on 25 July 2018. Chairman Pakistan Tehreek-e-Insaf, Imran Khan won the election but vacated this constituency and three others in favor of NA-95 (Mianwali-I).

By-election 2018

By-elections were held in this constituency on 14 October 2018.

By-election 2023 
A by-election will be held on 16 March 2023 due to the resignation of Ali Nawaz Awan, the previous MNA from this seat.

See also
NA-46 Islamabad-I
NA-48 Islamabad-III

References

External links 
Election result's official website
Delimitation 2018 official website Election Commission of Pakistan

53
53